Dallas Executive Airport , formerly Redbird Airport, is six miles (10 km) southwest of Downtown Dallas, in Dallas County, Texas, United States. The airport is used for general aviation and is a reliever airport for Dallas Love Field.

In 2013, the Commemorative Air Force announced that they would build a "National Airbase" at Executive which would include their headquarters and main museum, both of which would be moved from Midland. As of 2016, the Commemorative Air Force established their headquarters at the airport and currently occupies a hangar on the southeast side of the airfield. The Dallas Police Department operates their helicopter(s) from Dallas Executive Airport.

During 2017, extensive work was done to improve the existing runway, and more work is being done in 2018 to extend runway 13/31 to move the safety areas and protections zones onto the airport.

Facilities
 13/31: 7,136 x 100 ft (1,966 x 30.48 m) asphalt/concrete
 17/35: 3,800 x 150 ft (1,158 x 46 m) asphalt/concrete

Accidents and incidents
 November 12, 2022: in the 2022 Dallas airshow mid-air collision, a Boeing B-17 Flying Fortress and a Bell P-63 Kingcobra collided and crashed at approximately 1:20 pm local time at the Wings Over Dallas airshow at the airport. Six perished, five occupants on the B-17 and the pilot on the P-63. The cause of the accident is under investigation.

References

Dallas Executive Airport (City of Dallas website)
Dallas Executive Airport (official airport website)

External links

Airports in Dallas
Airports in the Dallas–Fort Worth metroplex
Airports in Texas
Transportation in Dallas County, Texas